The Topaz Omega is a sailing dinghy created by Topper International designed for between 1 and 7 crew members. It is sailed at many clubs around the world and is an ISAF 'Learn to Sail' class.

Performance and design
The Omega is an incredibly versatile three-sail boat that is fantastic for club racing, teaching or estuary sailing and picnicking. This boat is the largest in the Topper range (the hull can comfortably hold up to six). The beamy, chined hull inspires great confidence making the Omega stable and easy to control. The huge, spacious cockpit with its gnav kicker offers roomy and comfortable sailing and is an ideal teaching platform for large groups. The boat can be sailed single-handedly due to the zip-reefing system in the mainsail adding yet another layer of versatility.

The Omega is a versatile dinghy that can be used for learning to sail, to club racing. The Omega, the largest of the topper range, is a good boat for training, being stable with plenty of room for three trainees and an instructor. The boat has a Gnav kicker system which gives you more room in the cockpit.

References

External links
 Topper International - Omega

Dinghies
Sailboat types built by Topper International